Shri Rudrashtakam is a Sanskrit composition in devotion of Rudra, composed by the Hindu Bhakti poet Tulsidas. Tulsidas composed this prayer  in the late fifteenth century in Uttar Pradesh in India and created many other literary pieces including the magnum opus Ram Charit Manas.

The devotional hymn "Rudrashtakam" appears in the Uttara Kand of the celebrated Ram Charit Manas, where the sage Lomasha composed the hymn to propitiate Lord Shiva. His main purpose was to set his pupil free from the curse of Shiva. He succeeded and asked also a second boon (devotion for himself). His pupil would be the bird ' Kaga-Bhusundi' in a next life, a devotee of Shri Rama and an excellent teller of the life story of Shri Rama.

The Ashtakam is in reverence to Rudra, though the context pertains to the Shiva, the post-Vedic form of Rudra.

This is composed in Bhujangaprayāt chhanda and Jagati meter which consists of 12 letters in each of the four stages having only YAGANA four times in single verse consists of 48 letters.

Bhujanga means snake and Prayāt means movement

The Rudrashtakam is lucid and simple in style and plays an instrumental role in the Shaiva traditions.

Poetry

The term "Astakam" is derived from the Sanskrit word , meaning "eight". An astakam is made up of eight stanzas.

In Rudrashtakam, each stanza is written in Jagati meter, and hence contains 48 syllables per stanza. Each line is written in the Bhujangaprayāt chhand, containing four groups of light-heavy-heavy syllables (।ऽऽ ।ऽऽ ।ऽऽ ।ऽऽ).

An astakam belong to the genre of lyric poetry, which tends to be short, extremely melodic, and contemplative. It reflects and portrays the poet's own feelings, states of mind, and perceptions about the theme or character in the Astakam.

Context
The Rudrashtakam narrates the qualities and deeds of Shiva.

The body of the Rudrashtakam includes many qualities, attributes and motifs associated with Shiva, including the destruction of Tripura, the annihilation of Kamadeva etc. These symbols and motifs related to the life and deeds of Rudra or Shiva.

Text
See Sanskrit for details of pronunciation.

See also
 Shiv Chalisa, verse dedicated to Shiva

References

External links
Information in Hindi
 दुख दारिद्र्य दहन शिव स्तोत्र

 श्रीरुद्राष्टकम् मंत्र अर्थ सहित
Rudrastakam
Rudrastakam pdf
Rudrastakam on Youtube

Shaiva texts
Hindu philosophers and theologians